Cyperus poecilus is a species of sedge that is native to the Horn of Africa.

The species was first formally described by the botanist Charles Baron Clarke in 1901.

See also
 List of Cyperus species

References

poecilus
Taxa named by Charles Baron Clarke
Plants described in 1901
Flora of Somalia
Flora of Eritrea